Breathe is an extended play (EP) by English musician Birdy, released prior to the 2014 North American release of her second album, Fire Within. It contains three songs from Fire Within (two studio versions and one live version), one song from the Australian Special Edition of her first album, Birdy, and one live version of a song from that same album.

Track listing

Charts

Weekly charts

References

2013 albums
Birdy (singer) albums